Heckler is a 2007 documentary film about hecklers.

The film begins with an examination of the means, methods, and motives of hecklers and their effect on live performances, particularly stand up comedy. A common observation by professional comics is that hecklers can be categorized in two groups: those who want to participate and sincerely believe they're helping the comedian, and those who intend to disrupt the comedian. Several male comedians suggest that female hecklers are often motivated by a desire to flirt with the performer.

Subsequently, the film segues into a longer examination of film and music critics, including their effect on performers. The documentary suggests that most critics are motivated by frustrated artistic ambitions, and are no better than hecklers given that internet criticism has emboldened critics to engage in vicious personal attacks rather than critiques of artists' work.

The film is hosted by actor/comedian Jamie Kennedy, who was inspired to create the movie after feeling hurt by the overwhelmingly poor reception of his 2005 film Son of the Mask, in which reviewers and fans of the original 1994 film attacked Kennedy personally rather than reviewing the film. Interviewees include comedians Louie Anderson, Kathy Griffin, Bobby Slayton, Patton Oswalt, Joe Rogan, Arsenio Hall, Carrot Top, Maria Bamford and George Wallace; medical doctor Drew Pinsky; writer Christopher Hitchens; political commentator Dennis Prager; producer Peter Guber; directors Joel Schumacher, George Lucas and Rob Zombie; and singer Jewel Kilcher.

Heckler also includes footage of much-derided filmmaker Uwe Boll's boxing matches with several of his most vocal critics.

Release
Heckler premiered at the 2007 Tribeca Film Festival. The film never received a wide or limited release, going direct to DVD.

Reception
Heckler received mixed reviews. Rotten Tomatoes gave this film a 60% approval rating with a 6.48/10 rating from 5 reviews.  Jester Journal spoke negatively about Heckler, calling it a "misfiring attempt to take on hecklers and critics". Joel Keller from The Huffington Post said that the film became more about "Jamie's revenge" and called it a disappointment. Mother Jones called the film coarse, crass, yet surprisingly smart. Adam Renkovish from CultureMass called the film a "self-indulgent bait and switch".

References

External links

 
 

Documentary films about comedy and comedians
2000s English-language films